WMO Imam Gazzali College, Panamaram is an undergraduate college of Wayanad in India. 
The college is situated at Koolivayal in Panamaram. The college is affiliated with Kannur University.

References

Universities and colleges in Wayanad district
Colleges affiliated to Kannur University
Mananthavady Area